Pimelea avonensis is a species of flowering plant in the family Thymelaeaceae and is endemic to the south-west of Western Australia. It is a shrub with narrowly egg-shaped or elliptic leaves and clusters of white, tube-shaped flowers.

Description
Flowering occurs from July to October.

Taxonomy
Pimelea avonensis  was first formally described in 1988 by Barbara Lynette Rye in the journal Nuytsia from specimens collected in the Wongan Hills in 1983. The specific epithet (avonensis) refers to the Avon Botanical District in which this species occurs.

Distribution and habitat
This pimelea mainly grows on sandplains and breakaways, often in woodland and shrubland, mainly from Wilroy Nature Reserve near Mullewa, southeast to Moorine Rock in the Avon Wheatbelt, Coolgardie, Geraldton Sandplains and Yalgoo bioregions of south-western Western Australia.

Conservation status
Pimelea avonensis is listed as "not threatened" by the Government of Western Australia Department of Biodiversity, Conservation and Attractions.

References

avonensis
Endemic flora of Western Australia
Malvales of Australia
Plants described in 1988